This is a timeline of artists, albums, and events in progressive rock and its subgenres.  This article contains the timeline for the period 1980 - 1989.

Contents
1980 - 1981 - 1982 - 1983 - 1984 - 1985 - 1986 - 1987 - 1988 - 1989

 See also
 Links and references


1980

Newly formed bands

Albums

Disbandments
 Den Za Den
 Gentle Giant
 Catherine Ribeiro + Alpes

Events
 Sky: Francis Monkman (keyboards) departs. Replaced by Steve Gray.
 Los Jaivas presents Obras de Violeta Parra for the first time in France.
 Former Pop Mašina members form hard rock band Rok Mašina.

1981

Newly formed bands 
 Asia
 Queensrÿche

Reformed bands 
King Crimson

Albums

Disbandments
 Art Bears
 Na Lepem Prijazni (temporarily)
 National Health
 Tako
 Yes (temporarily)
 YU Grupa (temporarily)

Events
 Robert Fripp and Bill Bruford form new band Discipline, but after initial live dates Fripp decides the band constitutes a new incarnation of King Crimson.
Former Yes members Chris Squire and Alan White try to put together XYZ with Jimmy Page and Robert Plant from Led Zeppelin, but the project fails to go beyond rehearsals and the recording of several demos at Chris Squire's home studio due to Plant's dislike for the complicated musical arrangements. Steve Howe goes on to form Asia. Yes reformed in 1983.
 National Health keyboardist Alan Gowen dies.
 Aerodrom release the album Tango Bango, making shift towards new wave.
 Gordi release the album Pakleni trio, making shift towards heavy metal.

1982

Newly formed bands 
 In Cahoots
 IQ
 Voivod
 Thinking Plague

Albums

Disbandments
Predmestje

Events
 14 July - Pink Floyd releases their movie version of The Wall in the UK (13 Aug in the US).

1983

Newly formed bands 
 Apocalypse
 Death
 Fates Warning
 News from Babel

Reformed bands 
Yes

Albums

Disbandments
Begnagrad
Earth & Fire

Events
 John Wetton is fired from Asia just prior to a Japanese tour and is replaced by Greg Lake. Wetton returned to the band in 1984. 
 Yes reform with long-time members Jon Anderson, Chris Squire and Alan White, recruiting ex-member Tony Kaye who was fired in 1970 and new guitarist, Trevor Rabin to form a "Yes for the 1980s".
 After the supportive tour for ...Famous Last Words..., Roger Hodgson leaves Supertramp.

1984

Newly formed bands

Albums

Disbandments
 Gordi
 Soft Machine

Events
 Sky: John Williams (acoustic guitar) departs. Remaining members tour Australia with Rick Wakeman.

1985

Newly formed bands 
 Dream Theater
 King's X
 Magellan

Albums

Disbandments
 Igra Staklenih Perli

Events
 IQ vocalist Peter Nicholls leaves for personal reasons. He is replaced by Paul Menel who debuts on 14 November 1985.
 Pink Floyd leader, bassist and lyricist Roger Waters leaves due to internal tensions within the band, and declares the band defunct, however the remaining members still continue, releasing A Momentary Lapse of Reason in 1987.

1986

Newly formed bands 
 Emerson, Lake & Powell
 Mastermind
 Mystery

Albums

Disbandments
 Electric Light Orchestra
 Emerson, Lake & Powell
 News from Babel

Events
Charlie Dominici becomes the lead singer for Dream Theater after firing of Chris Collins

1987

Newly formed bands 
 Devil Doll
 Discipline
 Kingston Wall
 Porcupine Tree

Reformed bands 
 YU Grupa

Albums

Disbandments
 Twelfth Night

Events
Korni Grupa makes a brief reunion to perform on Legende YU Rocka concerts.
YU Grupa release their comeback hard rock-oriented album Od zlata jabuka; the band's future releases would feature similar sound.

1988

Newly formed bands 
 Anderson Bruford Wakeman Howe

Albums

Disbandments
 After the 1988 tour, Supertramp goes on hiatus.

Events
 Vocalist Fish leaves Marillion and is replaced by Steve Hogarth.
 Yes vocalist Jon Anderson wishes to return to the "classic Yes" sound and so forms Anderson Bruford Wakeman Howe with Yes alumni.
 Drummer Gabriel Parra of Los Jaivas Died in a car accident in Peru.

1989

Newly formed bands 
 Atavism of Twilight
 Echolyn
 Electric Light Orchestra Part Two
 Enchant
 Iona
 Keep the Dog
 Conception

Albums

Disbandments
 Charlie Dominici leaves Dream Theater

Events
IQ - vocalist Paul Menel and bass player Tim Essau depart.

See also
 Timeline of progressive rock: other decades: 1960s - 1970s - 1990s - 2000s - 2010s – 2020s
 Timeline of progressive rock (Parent article)
 Progressive rock
 Canterbury Scene
 Symphonic rock
 Avant-rock
 Rock in Opposition
 Neo-prog
 Progressive metal
 Jazz fusion

Further reading
 Lucky, Jerry.  The Progressive Rock Files Burlington, Ontario: Collector's Guide Publishing, Inc (1998), 304 pages,  (paperback).  Gives an overview of progressive rock's history as well as histories of the major and underground bands in the genre.
 Macan, Edward.  Rocking the Classics:  English Progressive Rock and the Counterculture. Oxford:  Oxford University Press (1997), 290 pages,  (hardcover),  (paperback).  Analyzes progressive rock using classical musicology and also sociology.

Timeline
Progressive rock
Timeline of progressive rock
1980s in music
Music history by genre